Anne Hobbs (born 21 August 1959 in Nottingham) is a British former professional tennis player.

Early life
She started with Wilmslow Tennis Club.

She lived at Alderley Edge.

Tennis career
Hobbs represented Great Britain in the Wightman Cup and Federation Cup from 1978 to 1989. She was ranked as the top British player for periods during her 12-year career and achieved a best WTA ranking of 33 in singles and 6 in doubles.

Although primarily a doubles specialist, reaching the final of the Australian Open in 1983 and the US Open in 1984 with Wendy Turnbull and the Australian Open Mixed Doubles in 1987 with Andrew Castle, she won singles titles at Indianapolis in 1983 and in Auckland in 1985 and the British Closed in 1985.

She had singles victories over Virginia Wade, Rosie Casals, Jo Durie, Carling Bassett, and Zina Garrison. She works as a tennis coach and consultant in the area of sports psychology.

WTA Tour finals

Singles (2–0)

Doubles (8–12)

Mixed doubles (0–1)

Performance timelines

( * ) Received a bye in the first round.

Singles

Doubles

Mixed doubles

Fed Cup

References

External links
 
 
 

1959 births
Living people
British female tennis players
English female tennis players
English expatriates in the United States
English tennis coaches
People educated at the Hollies Convent Grammar School
People from Alderley Edge
Sportspeople from New York City
Sportspeople from Nottingham
Tennis people from Cheshire
Tennis people from Nottinghamshire